

The Oswald Veblen Prize in Geometry is an award granted by the American Mathematical Society for notable research in geometry or topology.  It was founded in 1961 in memory of Oswald Veblen.  The Veblen Prize is now worth US$5000, and is awarded every three years.

The first seven prize winners were awarded for works in topology. James Harris Simons and William Thurston were the first ones to receive it for works in geometry (for some distinctions, see geometry and topology). As of 2020, there have been thirty-four prize recipients.

List of recipients
 1964 Christos Papakyriakopoulos
 1964 Raoul Bott
 1966 Stephen Smale
 1966 Morton Brown and Barry Mazur
 1971 Robion Kirby
 1971 Dennis Sullivan
 1976 William Thurston
 1976 James Harris Simons
 1981 Mikhail Gromov for:
Manifolds of negative curvature. Journal of Differential Geometry 13 (1978), no. 2, 223–230.
Almost flat manifolds. Journal of Differential Geometry 13 (1978), no. 2, 231–241.
Curvature, diameter and Betti numbers. Comment. Math. Helv. 56 (1981), no. 2, 179–195.
Groups of polynomial growth and expanding maps. Inst. Hautes Études Sci. Publ. Math. 53 (1981), 53–73.
Volume and bounded cohomology. Inst. Hautes Études Sci. Publ. Math. 56 (1982), 5–99
 1981 Shing-Tung Yau for:
On the regularity of the solution of the n-dimensional Minkowski problem. Comm. Pure Appl. Math. 29 (1976), no. 5, 495–516. (with Shiu-Yuen Cheng)
On the regularity of the Monge-Ampère equation . Comm. Pure Appl. Math. 30 (1977), no. 1, 41–68. (with Shiu-Yuen Cheng)
Calabi's conjecture and some new results in algebraic geometry. Proc. Natl. Acad. Sci. U.S.A. 74 (1977), no. 5, 1798–1799.
On the Ricci curvature of a compact Kähler manifold and the complex Monge-Ampère equation. I. Comm. Pure Appl. Math. 31 (1978), no. 3, 339–411.
On the proof of the positive mass conjecture in general relativity. Comm. Math. Phys. 65 (1979), no. 1, 45–76. (with Richard Schoen)
Topology of three-dimensional manifolds and the embedding problems in minimal surface theory. Ann. of Math. (2) 112 (1980), no. 3, 441–484. (with William Meeks)
 1986 Michael Freedman for:
The topology of four-dimensional manifolds. Journal of Differential Geometry 17 (1982), no. 3, 357–453.
 1991 Andrew Casson for:
his work on the topology of low dimensional manifolds and specifically for the discovery of an integer valued invariant of homology three spheres whose reduction mod(2) is the invariant of Rohlin.
 1991 Clifford Taubes for:
Self-dual Yang-Mills connections on non-self-dual 4-manifolds. Journal of Differential Geometry 17 (1982), no. 1, 139–170.
Gauge theory on asymptotically periodic 4-manifolds. J. Differential Geom. 25 (1987), no. 3, 363–430.
Casson's invariant and gauge theory. J. Differential Geom. 31 (1990), no. 2, 547–599.
 1996 Richard S. Hamilton for:
The formation of singularities in the Ricci flow. Surveys in differential geometry, Vol. II (Cambridge, MA, 1993), 7–136, Int. Press, Cambridge, MA, 1995.
Four-manifolds with positive isotropic curvature. Comm. Anal. Geom. 5 (1997), no. 1, 1–92.
 1996 Gang Tian for:
On Calabi's conjecture for complex surfaces with positive first Chern class. Invent. Math. 101 (1990), no. 1, 101–172.
Compactness theorems for Kähler-Einstein manifolds of dimension 3 and up. J. Differential Geom. 35 (1992), no. 3, 535–558.
A mathematical theory of quantum cohomology. J. Differential Geom. 42 (1995), no. 2, 259–367. (with Yongbin Ruan)
Kähler-Einstein metrics with positive scalar curvature. Invent. Math. 130 (1997), no. 1, 1–37.
 2001 Jeff Cheeger for:
Families index for manifolds with boundary, superconnections, and cones. I. Families of manifolds with boundary and Dirac operators. J. Funct. Anal. 89 (1990), no. 2, 313–363. (with Jean-Michel Bismut)
Families index for manifolds with boundary, superconnections and cones. II. The Chern character. J. Funct. Anal. 90 (1990), no. 2, 306–354. (with Jean-Michel Bismut)
Lower bounds on Ricci curvature and the almost rigidity of warped products. Ann. of Math. (2) 144 (1996), no. 1, 189–237. (with Tobias Colding)
On the structure of spaces with Ricci curvature bounded below. I. J. Differential Geom. 46 (1997), no. 3, 406–480. (with Tobias Colding)
 2001 Yakov Eliashberg for:
Combinatorial methods in symplectic geometry. Proceedings of the International Congress of Mathematicians, Vol. 1, 2 (Berkeley, Calif., 1986), 531–539, Amer. Math. Soc., Providence, RI, 1987.
Classification of overtwisted contact structures on 3-manifolds. Invent. Math. 98 (1989), no. 3, 623–637.
 2001 Michael J. Hopkins for:
Nilpotence and stable homotopy theory. I. Ann. of Math. (2) 128 (1988), no. 2, 207–241. (with Ethan Devinatz and Jeffrey Smith)
The rigid analytic period mapping, Lubin-Tate space, and stable homotopy theory. Bull. Amer. Math. Soc. (N.S.) 30 (1994), no. 1, 76–86. (with Benedict Gross)
Equivariant vector bundles on the Lubin-Tate moduli space. Topology and representation theory (Evanston, IL, 1992), 23–88, Contemp. Math., 158, Amer. Math. Soc., Providence, RI, 1994. (with Benedict Gross)
Elliptic spectra, the Witten genus and the theorem of the cube. Invent. Math. 146 (2001), no. 3, 595–687. (with Matthew Ando and Neil Strickland)
Nilpotence and stable homotopy theory. II. Ann. of Math. (2) 148 (1998), no. 1, 1–49. (with Jeffrey Smith)
 2004 David Gabai
 2007 Peter Kronheimer and Tomasz Mrowka for:
The genus of embedded surfaces in the projective plane. Math. Res. Lett. 1 (1994), no. 6, 797–808.
Embedded surfaces and the structure of Donaldson's polynomial invariants. J. Differential Geom. 41 (1995), no. 3, 573–734.
Witten's conjecture and property P. Geom. Topol. 8 (2004), 295–310.
 2007 Peter Ozsváth and Zoltán Szabó for:
Holomorphic disks and topological invariants for closed three-manifolds. Ann. of Math. (2) 159 (2004), no. 3, 1027–1158.
Holomorphic disks and three-manifold invariants: properties and applications. Ann. of Math. (2) 159 (2004), no. 3, 1159–1245.
Holomorphic disks and genus bounds. Geom. Topol. 8 (2004), 311–334.
 2010 Tobias Colding and William Minicozzi II for:
The space of embedded minimal surfaces of fixed genus in a 3-manifold. I. Estimates off the axis for disks. Ann. of Math. (2) 160 (2004), no. 1, 27–68.
The space of embedded minimal surfaces of fixed genus in a 3-manifold. II. Multi-valued graphs in disks. Ann. of Math. (2) 160 (2004), no. 1, 69–92.
The space of embedded minimal surfaces of fixed genus in a 3-manifold. III. Planar domains. Ann. of Math. (2) 160 (2004), no. 2, 523–572.
The space of embedded minimal surfaces of fixed genus in a 3-manifold. IV. Locally simply connected. Ann. of Math. (2) 160 (2004), no. 2, 573–615.
The Calabi-Yau conjectures for embedded surfaces. Ann. of Math. (2) 167 (2008), no. 1, 211–243.
 2010 Paul Seidel for:
A long exact sequence for symplectic Floer cohomology. Topology 42 (2003), no. 5, 1003–1063.
The symplectic topology of Ramanujam's surface. Comment. Math. Helv. 80 (2005), no. 4, 859–881. (with Ivan Smith)
Fukaya categories and Picard-Lefschetz theory. Zurich Lectures in Advanced Mathematics. European Mathematical Society (EMS), Zürich, 2008. viii+326 pp.
Exact Lagrangian submanifolds in simply-connected cotangent bundles. Invent. Math. 172 (2008), no. 1, 1–27. (with Kenji Fukaya and Ivan Smith)
 2013 Ian Agol for:
Lower bounds on volumes of hyperbolic Haken 3-manifolds. With an appendix by Nathan Dunfield. J. Amer. Math. Soc. 20 (2007), no. 4, 1053–1077. (with Daniel Storm and William Thurston)
Criteria for virtual fibering. J. Topol. 1 (2008), no. 2, 269–284.
Residual finiteness, QCERF and fillings of hyperbolic groups. Geom. Topol. 13 (2009), no. 2, 1043–1073. (with Daniel Groves and Jason Fox Manning)
 2013 Daniel Wise for:
Subgroup separability of graphs of free groups with cyclic edge groups. Q. J. Math. 51 (2000), no. 1, 107–129.
The residual finiteness of negatively curved polygons of finite groups. Invent. Math. 149 (2002), no. 3, 579–617.
Special cube complexes. Geom. Funct. Anal. 17 (2008), no. 5, 1551–1620. (with Frédéric Haglund)
A combination theorem for special cube complexes. Ann. of Math. (2) 176 (2012), no. 3, 1427–1482. (with Frédéric Haglund)
 2016 Fernando Codá Marques and André Neves for:
Min-max theory and the Willmore conjecture. Ann. of Math. (2) 179 (2014), no. 2, 683–782.
Min-max theory and the energy of links. J. Amer. Math. Soc. 29 (2016), no. 2, 561–578. (with Ian Agol)
Existence of infinitely many minimal hypersurfaces in positive Ricci curvature. Invent. Math. 209 (2017), no. 2, 577–616. 
 2019 Xiuxiong Chen, Simon Donaldson and Song Sun for:
Kähler-Einstein metrics on Fano manifolds. I: Approximation of metrics with cone singularities. J. Amer. Math. Soc. 28 (2015), no. 1, 183–197.
Kähler-Einstein metrics on Fano manifolds. II: Limits with cone angle less than 2π. J. Amer. Math. Soc. 28 (2015), no. 1, 199–234.
Kähler-Einstein metrics on Fano manifolds. III: Limits as cone angle approaches 2π and completion of the main proof. J. Amer. Math. Soc. 28 (2015), no. 1, 235–278.
 2022  Michael A. Hill, Michael J. Hopkins, and Douglas Ravenel for:
On the nonexistence of elements of Kervaire invariant one. Annals of Mathematics SECOND SERIES, Vol. 184, No. 1 (July, 2016), pp. 1-262

See also

 List of mathematics awards

References

External links
 Veblen prize home page

Awards of the American Mathematical Society
Awards established in 1961
Triennial events
Geometry
Topology